The qualification competition for the 2008 AFC U-19 Championship took place from 17 October 2007 to 28 November 2007. Saudi Arabia qualified automatically as hosts.

Teams that did not enter

Group A

All matches played home & away

Group B

Group C

Group D

Group E

Group F

Group G

Qualified For The AFC U-19 Championship 2008

 Australia

 

 (host country)

References

External links 
Details on AFC.com

2008
Qual
Qual